Monarchism in Serbia details the history of monarchist government in the country and its predecessors, and encompasses modern advocacy of restoring returning Serbia's form of government to a constitutional monarchy.

Alexander, Crown Prince of Yugoslavia, head of the Karađorđević dynasty, the most recent former royal house of the Kingdom of Yugoslavia and Kingdom of Serbia, is a proponent of re-creating a constitutional monarchy in Serbia and sees himself as the rightful king. He believes that the monarchy could give Serbia "stability, continuity and unity".

History
Serbia as an independent territory was ruled under a monarchy from its obtaining autonomy and subsequently independence from the Ottoman Empire in the early 19th century until the installation of the provisional government of the Partisans-led Democratic Federal Yugoslavia in the mid-1940s, first as Revolutionary Serbia, then as the Principality of Serbia, Kingdom of Serbia, and finally a part of the Kingdom of Yugoslavia. After being forced to flee and form a government-in-exile following the Axis invasion of the country in 1941, the monarchy was officially abolished following the end of World War II, giving rise to the Socialist Federal Republic of Yugoslavia.

Movement to restore the monarchy 
The Centre for Research of Orthodox Monarchism is a Serbian monarchist association from Belgrade, founded in 2001 and registered with the Ministry of Justice of Federal Republic of Yugoslavia in May 2002.

Following Montenegro's successful independence referendum on 21 May 2006, the re-creation of the Serbian monarchy found its way into daily political debate. A monarchist proposal for the new Serbian constitution has been published alongside other proposals. The document approved in October 2006 is a republican one. The Serbian people have not had a chance to vote on the system of government.

The Crown Prince raised the issue of a royal restoration in the immediate aftermath of the vote. In a press release issued on 24 May 2006 he stated:

A number of political parties and organizations support a constitutional parliamentary monarchy in Serbia. The Serbian Orthodox Church has openly supported the restoration of the monarchy.

Polling
In 2011 an online open access poll by Serbian middle-market tabloid newspaper Blic showed that 64% of Serbians support restoring the monarchy. 

Another poll in May 2013 had 39% of Serbians supporting the monarchy, with 32% against it. The public also had reservations with Alexander's apparent lack of knowledge of the Serbian language. 

On 27 July 2015, newspaper Blic published a poll "Da li Srbija treba da bude monarhija?" ("Should Serbia be a monarchy?"); 49.8% respondents expressed support in a reconstitution of monarchy, 44.6% were opposed and 5.5% were indifferent.

Parties
Serbian Renewal Movement (1990–present)
New Serbia (1998–present)
Movement for the Restoration of the Kingdom of Serbia (2017–present)

References

Monarchism in Serbia
Restoration of the monarchy